Steven Thomas Fischer is an American film director, producer, and cartoonist. His work has been honored by the Directors Guild of America, The New York Festivals, the CINE Golden Eagle Awards, and Marquis Who's Who in Entertainment.

Career
Fischer began his career at age 17 as a cartoonist, writing and illustrating freelance. One of his early writing credits is as a contributing writer for Access Budget Europe (1994) published by HarperCollins. In 1991, Fischer moved to London, England and attended classes at the London Cartoon Centre while developing proposals for animated films and television programs. Most notable were his Steve & Bluey cartoons which later aired in America through TCI Communications of Baltimore.  The cartoons revived a vaudevillian style of family entertainment influenced by Fischer's childhood idols, Abbott & Costello. Steve & Bluey featured a young nerdy boy named Steve partnered with a sassy quick-witted blue dog. Much of their humor relied on heavy dialogue and a sharp clash of personalities. Print cartoons were published in two volumes entitled There's a Blue Dog Under My Bed and The Wonderful, Happy, Cartoony World of Steve & Bluey. Radio plays were released through a variety of broadcasters and radio production groups, most notably the Holiday Broadcasting Company and The Golden Radio Players. Fischer voiced both lead characters.

His fiction and non-fiction stories are distinguished by character studies that search for understanding such as the Emmy Award-nominated docu-drama Now & Forever Yours: Letters to an Old Soldier, dramatizing the true story of a secret romance between Major Joseph Willard, a Union officer, and Antonia Ford, a Southern belle, during the American Civil War. 

His 60-second Polish-language public service announcement, Silence of Falling Leaves (which he wrote, produced, and directed for The Polish National Alliance and TCI Communications of Baltimore), aired in Poland through TVP Polonia in 2000.  According to the Latvian news portal, TVNet, the film consisted entirely of images of falling autumn leaves with a sound track cut to a narration in Polish by the Warsaw-born artist Bozena Jedrzejczak. The cinematographer was Fischer's longtime friend and collaborator, John Chester. Baltimore Magazine described the multi award-winning PSA as, "an art film trapped inside a commercial."

His personal and artful style of storytelling has been utilized in films for organizations including Maryland Public Television, TV Asia, Nextel/NII Holdings, DuPont, Chicago Symphony Orchestra, National Foundation for Advancement in the Arts, Nalco/Ecolab, and University of Maryland, Baltimore County.

In 2007, Fischer directed Mariska Hargitay in Freedom Dance, the critically acclaimed animated documentary about the escape of a young couple from Communist Hungary to the United States during the Hungarian Revolution of 1956.

In 2011, he produced and directed Old School New School, a personal study on creativity in which the director, who also appears on camera, crisscrosses the United States to learn about voice, security versus risk, and the meaning of success. The film features the Emmy Award-winning actor Brian Cox, multi Grammy Award-winning jazz pianist McCoy Tyner, Tony Award-winning producer Emanuel Azenberg, and five-time Academy Award-nominated cinematographer William A. Fraker among many other acclaimed artists. The distributor SnagFilms acquired the film in 2011. In 2020, Films Media Group acquired the film as academic distributor.

In 2014, Fischer released an updated version of the Steve & Bluey book The Wonderful, Happy, Cartoony World of Steve & Bluey (originally published in 2002 ), telling the exploits of a cartoon comedy team trying to make it in animated show business. To promote the release, Fischer launched a world tour offering creativity lectures and cartoon storytelling workshops at venues including Harvard Medical School (Boston), St. John's College Film Institute (Santa Fe, NM), The Second City Training Center (Chicago, IL), Debreceni Egyetemi Színház Theatre Festival  (Hungary), on a Transatlantic Crossing as special guest of SeaDream Yacht Club, and as special guest aboard Cunard's Queen Mary 2 touring the Middle East and Southeast Asia.

Fischer's track record also includes the role of Spencer Stanley in The FBI Files (1999)  on the Discovery Channel and directing two music videos for Jim Camacho, former front man for the legendary South Florida rock band The Goods. His international work includes documenting the first Irish National Tour of the critically acclaimed Off-Broadway play Coole Lady, a historical play about the life of Lady Gregory by noted playwright and W. B. Yeats biographer Sam McCready. In 2014, as a Fulbright Program Specialist, Fischer was a guest teacher at University of Debrecen, Hungary, presenting a course on Cartoon Storytelling.

Accolades and Honors
In 1996, Fischer was accepted into the Directors Guild of America with the promotional film production This is CLEARCorps, for and about AmeriCorps.

In 1997, Marquis Who's Who selected Fischer for inclusion in Marquis Who's Who in Entertainment.

In 2010, The Daily Record named Fischer as one of 60 Influential Marylanders.

In 2013 and 2022, Fischer was awarded the honor of Fulbright Specialist by the Fulbright Program, The U.S. Department of State's Bureau of Educational and Cultural Affairs and the Council for International Exchange of Scholars.

Fischer served as a Jury Chair for the CINE Awards in 2010, 2011, and 2012, and was named a jury member in 2014 and 2015. He was named as a member of the jury for the Academy Awards qualifier Chicago International Children's Film Festival in 2012, 2013, 2014, and 2016. In 2017, he was Jury Chair of the CICFF's Animated Shorts category.

Select Film Awards
Silence of Falling Leaves (2000, TCI Communications)

Emmy Award (Nomination) 

The New York Festivals (Finalist, Cinema and Television Advertising Awards)

Telly Award (Winner, Public Service Announcement)

Addy Award (Nomination)

Camp Med (2005, NVCC-TV)

Telly Award (Winner, Informational Programming)

The Videographer Awards (Winner, Award of Distinction)

Houdini (2005, Broken Records)

Telly Award (Winner, Music Video)

Gold Remi Award (Winner, Music Video, World Fest International Film Fest, Houston, Texas)

Great Lakes Film Festival, Pennsylvania (Official Selection)

Draw the Line: An Animator's Showcase (2006, NVCC-TV)

CINE Golden Eagle (winner, Documentary Short)

Telly Award (Winner, Arts & Leisure Programming)

Gold Remi Award (Winner, Documentary, World Fest International Film Fest, Houston, Texas)

Now & Forever Yours: Letters to an Old Soldier (2007, NVCC-TV)

Telly Award (Winner, Cinematography)

Emmy Award (Nomination, Cinematography)

Francis Scott Key: Legacy of a Life in Service (2007, ADG Creative)

Telly Award (Winner, History/Biography)

Independent Film Festival, Maryland (Official Selection)

Freedom Dance (2007, Blue Dog Productions, Inc / Herron Designs)

Rosebud Film Festival, Virginia (Winner, Best of Show) 

Peer Award (Winner, Documentary Under 30 Minutes) 

CINE Golden Eagle 

CINE Jury Award

CINE Masters Series Award 

Boston Motion Picture Awards (Finalist)

Frozen Moon 2006 Trailer Showdown, Wales, UK (Winner) 

Show Off Your Shorts Film Fest, Los Angeles (Nominated for Best Documentary)

Belvoir (2008, ADG Creative)

Telly Award (Winner, Documentary)

Independent Film Festival, Maryland, May 2008 (Official Selection)

References

External links
 IMDb
  Steven Fischer Tribute to Animation Legend Bill Melendez
 Maslow Media Group 
 The Budapest Sun
 The Official Steve & Bluey Website
 Official Site for Steven Thomas Fischer
 The Daily Record
 Steven Fischer in The Green Room, Fusion International Film Festivals, London, 2019

1972 births
Living people
American film producers
Artists from Baltimore
Film directors from Maryland
People from Maryland